The Prairie View A&M Panthers and Lady Panthers represent Prairie View A&M University in Prairie View, Texas in intercollegiate athletics. They field eighteen teams including men and women's basketball, cross country, golf, and indoor and outdoor track and field; women's-only bowling, soccer, softball, tennis, and volleyball; and men's-only baseball and football. The Panthers compete in the NCAA Division I and are members of the Southwestern Athletic Conference.

Sports sponsored

References

External links
 
Official Marching Storm website